Since the 2007 municipal reform and prior to this election, the Social Democrats had held the mayor's position twice, from 2010 to 2013, and again from 2017 to 2021, while Venstre had held it from 2014 to 2017. Hans Stavnsager would therefore become the first to be re-elected if his bid were successful.

In the 2017 election, the traditional red bloc parties would win just 13 seats, against 12 from parties of the traditional blue bloc. This led to Hans Stavnsager becoming the mayor.

In this election both TV2 Fyn and Mandag Morgen predicted that Hans Stavnsager would win a second term.

In the election result, the parties of the red bloc would win 14 of the 25 seats. Of the red bloc parties, The Alternative who won a seat in the 2017 election, did not stand, while the Danish Social Liberal Party would lose a seat. However the Social Democrats gained 2 seats, and the Green Left would gain 1 seat, despite the latter decreasing their vote share. Venstre would win 5 seats, the lowest ever in the municipality.
.

Therefore Hans Stavnsager was in pole position to continue, and it was eventually confirmed that he had the mandate to do it.

Electoral system
For elections to Danish municipalities, a number varying from 9 to 31 are chosen to be elected to the municipal council. The seats are then allocated using the D'Hondt method and a closed list proportional representation.
Faaborg-Midtfyn Municipality had 25 seats in 2021

Unlike in Danish General Elections, in elections to municipal councils, electoral alliances are allowed.

Electoral alliances  

Electoral Alliance 1

Electoral Alliance 2

Electoral Alliance 3

Results

Notes

References 

Faaborg-Midtfyn